Colonel Dương Hiếu Nghĩa (born c. 1925, Sa Đéc) was an officer in the Army of the Republic of Vietnam. He 
graduated from the Đà Lạt National Military Academy. During the Vietnam War, he served in various infantry and armored units. His highest administrative position was Province Chief of Vĩnh Long.

He, along with Captain Nguyễn Văn Nhung, executed President Ngô Đình Diệm and the President's confidant, his brother Ngô Đình Nhu after the latter were arrested at the end of an army coup. After the Fall of Saigon in 1975, Nghia spent at least a dozen years in various re-education camps. In 1992, he was allowed to emigrate to the United States under the Humanitarian Orderly Departure Program.

Execution of Diem 

Nghia was part of a group of military personnel sent to arrest Diem and Nhu at the conclusion of the successful coup. After arresting the brothers and tying them with their hands behind their backs, Nghia and Major Nguyen Van Nhung sat with Diệm and Nhu inside the Armored Personnel Carrier, and the convoy departed for Tân Sơn Nhứt Air Base. They stopped at a railroad crossing on the return trip where, by all accounts, the brothers were assassinated. An investigation by General Tran Van Don later determined that Nghĩa had shot the brothers at point-blank range with a semi-automatic firearm and that Nhung sprayed them with bullets before repeatedly stabbing their bodies with a knife.

Nghĩa gave his account of the assassinations to military headquarters: “As we rode back to the Joint General Staff headquarters, Diệm sat silently, but Nhu and the captain [Nhung] began to insult each other. I don’t know who started it. The name-calling grew passionate. The captain had hated Nhu before. Now he was charged with emotion.” When the convoy reached a train crossing, Nghĩa said that Nhung “lunged at Nhu with a bayonet and stabbed him again and again, maybe fifteen or twenty times. Still in a rage, he turned to Diệm, took out his revolver and shot him in the head. Then he looked back at Nhu, who was lying on the floor, twitching. He put a bullet into his head too. Neither Diệm nor Nhu ever defended themselves. Their hands were tied.”

1964 coup 

Nghia was then involved in a January 1964 coup, just three months later, against the military junta led by General Duong Van Minh that had toppled Diem. The plotters, led by General Nguyen Khanh, needed help from Nghĩa, one of the leading Đại Việt officers and temporary head of the Capital Armored Command. A friend and appointee of Minh, Nghia caused difficulties by failing to respond to General Nguyen Van Thieu's order that all armor be moved north out of Saigon to Thiệu's 5th Division headquarters at Biên Hòa, a satellite city on the northeastern edge of the capital. A CIA cable reported that Nghia was aware that the movements were part of a coup against Minh and told Thieu that he would not deploy out of the capital and declared his support for Minh. This caught the plotters off guard, and as Harkins left on his "fieldtrip" at the same time, historian George McTurnan Kahin conjectured that he had actually gone to lobby Nghia to support the coup or at least partially back it by agreeing to help depose Minh's confidants Đôn, Ton That Dinh, Le Van Kim and Mai Huu Xuan. However, it was then reported that Nghia had agreed to support Thieu, who had apparently then gained the control of both the armored and marine elements in Saigon.

When the coup began, Nghia showed his mixed feelings about the junta through the selective use of his armored troops. They supported Khánh's move against Đính, Đôn, Kim and Xuân, but tried to protect Minh by using tanks to shield Minh's house from Duong Ngoc Lam's Civil Guard units, which were also used to arrest the four other leading junta members.

See also
Arrest and assassination of Ngo Dinh Diem
1963 South Vietnamese coup

Notes

References

1920s births
Vietnamese anti-communists
Vietnamese assassins
Vietnamese military personnel
South Vietnamese military personnel of the Vietnam War
Assassins of heads of state
Vietnamese people of the Vietnam War
Vietnamese exiles
Possibly living people
Date of birth unknown
People from Đồng Tháp Province
1960s murders in Vietnam
1963 crimes in Vietnam
1963 murders in Asia